The red rainbowfish or salmon-red rainbowfish (Glossolepis incisus) is a species of rainbowfish from Lake Sentani in Irian Jaya, Indonesia. Belonging to the family Melanotaeniidae, in the subfamily Melanotaeniinae, the Australian rainbowfishes. It is threatened in its native range, but easily bred in captivity and common in the aquarium trade.

Description

The males are bright red and with age grow a high back. The females are olive brown in colour. Their colours change depending on their mood, but subordinate males do not display bright colours.

Breeding
They are an egg scattering species and they scatter their eggs among clumps of vegetation. The eggs take about 7 days to hatch.

Nutrition 
Glossolepis incisus is an omnivore and in captivity it will eat most common commercial aquarium foods readily.  It may be slightly more carnivorous than most of the Australian rainbowfish.

Conservation status 
The IUCN Red List classifies Glossolepis incisus as endangered. This is because of the rapidly increasing human population around this fish's only natural habitat and introduced species such as tilapia.

Distribution
This species is endemic to Lake Sentani and its tributaries near Jayapura in Papua, Indonesia (a range it shares with the related Chilatherina sentaniensis).

Taxonomy
Glossolepis incisus is the type species of the genus Glossolepis and was described by Max C.W. Weber in 1907.

References

Red rainbowfish
Freshwater fish of Western New Guinea
Fishkeeping
Taxa named by Max Carl Wilhelm Weber
Fish described in 1907